Ayatsimakhi (Dargwa: ГIяяцимахьи) is a rural locality (a selo) in Karbuchimakhinsky Selsoviet, Dakhadayevsky District, Republic of Dagestan, Russia. The population was 126 as of 2010.

Geography 
Ayatsimakhi is located 41 km southwest of Urkarakh (the district's administrative centre) by road. Karbuchimakhi and Duakar are the nearest rural localities.

Nationalities 
Dargins live there.

References 

Rural localities in Dakhadayevsky District